β-Carboline (9H-pyrido[3,4-b]indole) represents the basic chemical structure for more than one hundred alkaloids and synthetic compounds. The effects of these substances depend on their respective substituent. Natural β-carbolines primarily influence brain functions but can also exhibit antioxidant effects. Synthetically designed β-carboline derivatives have recently been shown to have neuroprotective, cognitive enhancing and anti-cancer properties.

Pharmacology
The pharmacological effects of specific β-carbolines are dependent on their substituents. For example, the natural β-carboline harmine has substituents on position 7 and 1. Thereby, it acts as a selective inhibitor of the DYRK1A protein kinase, a molecule necessary for neurodevelopment. It also exhibits various antidepressant-like effects in rats by interacting with serotonin receptor 2A. Furthermore, it increases levels of the brain-derived neurotrophic factor (BDNF) in rat hippocampus. A decreased BDNF level has been associated with major depression in humans. The antidepressant effect of harmine might also be due to its function as a MAO-A inhibitor by reducing the breakdown of serotonin and noradrenaline.

A synthetic derivative, 9-methyl-β-carboline, has shown neuroprotective effects including increased expression of neurotrophic factors and enhanced respiratory chain activity. This derivative has also been shown to enhance cognitive function, increase dopaminergic neuron count and facilitate synaptic and dendritic proliferation. It also exhibited therapeutic effects in animal models for Parkinson's disease and other neurodegenerative processes.

However, β-carbolines with substituents in position 3 reduce the effect of benzodiazepine on GABA-A receptors and can therefore have convulsive, anxiogenic and memory enhancing effects. Moreover, 3-hydroxymethyl-beta-carboline blocks the sleep-promoting effect of flurazepam in rodents and - by itself - can decrease sleep in a dose-dependent manner. Another derivative, methyl-β-carboline-3-carboxylate, stimulates learning and memory at low doses but can promote anxiety and convulsions at high doses. With modification in position 9 similar positive effects have been observed for learning and memory without promotion of anxiety or convulsion.

β-carboline derivatives also enhance the production of the antibiotic reveromycin A in soil dwelling "Streptomyces" species. Specifically, expression of biosynthetic genes is facilitated by binding of the β-carboline to a large ATP-binding regulator of the LuxR family.

Also Lactobacillus spp. secretes a β-carboline (1-acetyl-β-carboline) preventing the pathogenic fungus Candida albicans to change to a more virulent growth form (yeast-to-filament transition). Thereby, β-carboline reverses imbalances in the microbiome composition causing pathologies ranging from vaginal candidiasis to fungal sepsis.

Since β-carbolines also interact with various cancer-related molecules such as DNA, enzymes (GPX4, kinases, etc.) and proteins (ABCG2/BRCP1, etc.), they are also discussed as potential anticancer agents.

Explorative human studies for the medical use of β-carbolines 
The extract of the liana Banisteriopsis caapi has been used by the tribes of the Amazon as an entheogen and was described as a hallucinogen in the middle of the 19th century. In early 20th century, European pharmacists identified harmine as the active substance. This discovery stimulated the interest to further investigate its potential as a medicine. For example, Louis Lewin, a prominent pharmacologist, demonstrated a dramatic benefit in neurological impairments after injections of B. caapi in patients with postencephalitic Parkinsonism. By 1930, it was generally agreed that hypokinesia, drooling, mood, and sometimes rigidity improved by treatment with harmine. Altogether, 25 studies had been published in the 1920s and 1930s about patients with Parkinson's disease and postencephalitic Parkinsonism. The pharmacological effects of harmine have been attributed mainly to its central monoamine oxidase (MAO) inhibitory properties. In-vivo and rodent studies have shown that extracts of Banisteriopsis caapi and also Peganum harmala lead to striatal dopamine release. Furthermore, harmine supports the survival of dopaminergic neurons in MPTP-treated mice. Since harmine also antagonizes N-methyl-d-aspartate (NMDA) receptors, some researchers speculatively attributed the rapid improvement in patients with Parkinson's disease to these antiglutamatergic effects. However, the advent of synthetic anticholinergic drugs at that time led to the total abandonment of harmine.

Structure 
β-Carbolines belong to the group of indole alkaloids and consist of a pyridine ring that is fused to an indole skeleton. The structure of β-carboline is similar to that of tryptamine, with the ethylamine chain re-connected to the indole ring via an extra carbon atom, to produce a three-ringed structure. The biosynthesis of  β-carbolines is believed to follow this route from analogous tryptamines. Different levels of saturation are possible in the third ring which is indicated here in the structural formula  by coloring the optionally double bonds red and blue:

Examples of β-carbolines
Some of the more important β-carbolines are tabulated by structure below. Their structures may contain the aforementioned bonds marked by red or blue.

Natural occurrence

β-Carboline alkaloids are widespread in prokaryotes, plants and animals. Some β-carbolines, notably tetrahydro-β-carbolines, may be formed naturally in plants and the human body with tryptophan, serotonin and tryptamine as precursors.

 Altogether, eight plant families are known to express 64 different kinds of β-carboline alkaloids. For example, the β-carbolines harmine, harmaline, and tetrahydroharmine are components of the liana Banisteriopsis caapi and play a pivotal role in the pharmacology of the indigenous psychedelic drug ayahuasca. Moreover, the seeds of Peganum harmala (Syrian Rue) contain between 0.16% and 5.9% β-carboline alkaloids (by dry weight).
 A specific group of β-carboline derivatives, termed eudistomins, were extracted from ascidians (marine tunicates of the family Ascidiacea) such as Ritterella sigillinoides, Lissoclinum fragile  or Pseudodistoma aureum. 
 Nostocarboline was isolated from freshwater cyanobacterium.
 The fully aromatic β-carbolines also occur in many foodstuffs, however in lower concentrations. The highest amounts have been detected in brewed coffee, raisins, well done fish and meats. Smoking is another source of fully aromatic β-carbolines with levels up to thousands of µg per smoker each day.
 β-Carbolines have also been found in the cuticle of scorpions, causing their skin to fluoresce upon exposed to ultraviolet light at certain wavelengths (e.g. blacklight).

See also 
 Harmala alkaloid
 Tryptamine
 Gamma-carboline

References

External links 
 
 TiHKAL #44
 TiHKAL in general
 Beta-carbolines in coffee
 

Anxiolytics
Convulsants
 
Entheogens
Monoamine oxidase inhibitors
GABAA receptor negative allosteric modulators
Indole alkaloids